Thoughts is an album by American jazz trumpeter Bill Dixon recorded in 1985 and released on the Italian Soul Note label.

Reception

In his review for AllMusic, Scott Yanow stated "The music (six originals, including the four-part suite "For Nelson and Winnie") is quite adventurous, yet thoughtful, disturbing without being forbidding."

The authors of The Penguin Guide to Jazz Recordings noted that "Dixon's playing is at a discount, though his silences are resonantly meaningful too." However, they cautioned that the album "drifts off into inconsequential and sometimes pretentious ramblings."

Track listing
All compositions by Bill Dixon
 "Thoughts" - 11:20
 "Windows" - 4:40
 "For Nelson and Winnie" -18:53
 "A Song for Claudia's Children" - 11:10
 "Brothers" - 8:30
 "Points" - 8:45

Personnel
Bill Dixon - trumpet, flugelhorn, piano
 John Buckingham - tuba
 Marco Eneidi - alto saxophone
Peter Kowald, William Parker, Mario Pavone - bass
Lawrence Cook - drums

References

1987 albums
Bill Dixon albums
Black Saint/Soul Note albums